Adi Gudem (Tigrigna: ዓዲጉደም) is a town in Tigray, Ethiopia. It is one of the larger settlements in the Hintalo Wajirat district. Adi Gudem is located along Ethiopian Highway 2.

Populated places in the Tigray Region